Titanium(III) iodide is an inorganic compound with the formula TiI3.  It is a dark violet solid that is insoluble in solvents, except upon decomposition.

Preparation and structure 
Titanium(III) iodide can be prepared by reaction of titanium with iodine:

It can also be obtained by reduction of TiI4, e.g., with aluminium.

In terms of its structure, the compound exists as a polymer of face-sharing octahedra.  Above 323 K, the Ti---Ti spacing are equal, but below that temperature, the material undergoes a phase transition.  In the low temperature phase, the Ti---Ti contacts are alternating short and long.  The low temperature structure is similar to that of molybdenum tribromide.

References 

Titanium(III) compounds
Iodides
Inorganic polymers